The Bootmobile is a boot-shaped automobile made by L.L.Bean to celebrate its 100th anniversary in 2012. It was introduced on January 17, 2012. It has visited cities such as New York City with the intent of inspiring people to go outdoors.

It is 13 feet tall, 20 feet long, and 7 feet wide. The boot is made of steel and fiberglass and was based on a Ford F-250 Super Duty truck.

References

External links

Individual cars
L.L.Bean